The AfroBasket Women (formerly FIBA Africa Championship for Women) is the women's basketball continental championship of Africa, played biennially under the auspices of FIBA, the world governing body for basketball, and the African zone thereof. The tournament also serves to qualify teams for participation in the quadrennial FIBA Women's World Cup and the Olympic Games.

Results

Summaries

 A round-robin tournament determined the final standings.
 Withdrew.

Medal table

Tournament awards
Most recent award winners (2021)

Participating nations

See also
FIBA Africa Women's Clubs Champions Cup
FIBA U18 Women's African Championship
FIBA U16 Women's African Championship

References

External links
Women Basketball Africa Championship (todor66.com)
Women Basketball Africa Championship (the-sports.org)

 
Basketball Women
Women's basketball competitions in Africa between national teams
Recurring sporting events established in 1966